Afrasi may refer to:
 Afrasi, Babol
 Afrasi, Savadkuh